Kseniya Olegovna Ryzhova, née Vdovina (born April 19, 1987) is a Russian track and field sprint athlete, originally from Lipetsk. She was the 2013 World Champion in 4 × 400 m relay (running the third leg).

On March 7, 2014, at the 2014 World Indoor Championships, Ryzhova was tested for illegal substances, and the test subsequently revealed trimetazidine. She was disqualified for nine months.

Competition record

2013 Moscow kiss
During the medal ceremony for the women's 4×400 metres relay images of Kseniya Ryzhova and Yuliya Gushchina sharing a kiss on the lips spread through social media and were interpreted as a protest against the anti-gay laws. Both Ryzhova and Gushchina denied any intention to make such a protest, rather they were simply happy with their athletic success, and stated that they were married to men. Although reports were principally focused on the pair, all four of the Russia relay runners briefly kissed each other on the podium. Ryzhova described her assumed connection to LGBT as insulting. The Russian Minister for Sport, Vitaly Mutko, said that Western media had over-emphasised the issue, noting that same-sex relations are not illegal in Russia and sparser coverage of the issue in domestic media.

Notes

References

External links 

1987 births
Living people
Sportspeople from Lipetsk
Russian female sprinters
World Athletics Championships athletes for Russia
Doping cases in athletics
Russian sportspeople in doping cases
World Athletics Indoor Championships medalists
Competitors at the 2007 Summer Universiade